Gli uomini non guardano il cielo is a 1952 Italian drama film.

Cast
Henri Vidon: Pope Pius X
Tullio Carminati: Cardinal Merry del Val
Isa Miranda: The countess

External links 
 

1952 drama films
1950s Italian-language films
Films set in Rome
Films about popes
Italian drama films
Italian black-and-white films
1950s Italian films